Porter Records is a United States record label that specializes in jazz, hiphop, electronic, world, and experimental music. Its catalog is self-described as "music for the eclectic listener", with albums by artists Henry Grimes, Joe Chambers, Matthew Welch, Heikki Sarmanto, Chll Pll, and Mason Lindahl, among others.

See also 
 List of record labels

External links 
 Official Site 
 "A Collector's Rewards" feature about Porter Records by AllAboutJazz.com
 Stereo Subversion Interview with Zach Hill of Chll Pll about "Aggressively Humble"
 DRAM listing

References

American record labels
Record labels established in 2005